Jan de Nijs (born 25 January 1958) is a retired cyclist from the Netherlands. He began as a road racer and won the national team championships in 1983. He then focused on motor-paced racing and won every national championship between 1984 and 1990; in 1984 he also won the UCI Motor-paced World Championships.

References

1958 births
Living people
Dutch male cyclists
Cyclists from Amsterdam